Race is a surname. Notable people with the surname include:

Harley Race (1943-2019), US-American wrestler, coach and promoter
Hugo Race (born 1963), Australian musician
Janice Race, US-American, former comic book editor for DC Comics
John Abner Race (1914–1983), American politician
John Burton Race (born 1957), British chef
Steve Race (1921–2009), British musician and radio personality

Given name
 Race Davies (born 1962), British actress
 Race Imboden (born 1993), American fencer
 Race Mathews (born 1935), Australian co-operative economist
 Race Wong (born 1982), Singaporean actress